Bloodbath is a Swedish death-metal group from Stockholm.

Bloodbath may also refer to:

Crimes

Other terms for Bloodbath
 Mass murder
 Massacre, an indiscriminate killing or slaughter

Swedish massacres
 Kalmar Bloodbath (1505), a massacre by king John of Denmark
 Stockholm Bloodbath, a 1520 massacre in Stockholm
 Nydala Abbey Bloodbath, an 1520 execution of an abbot and several monks by Christian II of Denmark
 Ronneby Bloodbath, a 1564 massacre in the then-Danish city of Ronneby by the Swedish army 
 Kalmar Bloodbath (1599), an execution of  Sigismund loyalists on the order of Duke Charles
 Åbo Bloodbath, an execution of  Sigismund's followers by the end of the war against Sigismund
 Linköping Bloodbath, a massacre of the defeated advisers of King Sigismund

Media
 Blood Bath, a 1966 horror thriller directed by Jack Hil and Stephanie Rothman
 Bloodbath, the UK title for the 1971 Italian horror thriller directed by Mario Bava, Twitch of the Death Nerve
 "Bloodbath" (NCIS), a 2006 episode of NCIS

Other
 1945 VFL Grand Final, an Australian rules football game commonly known as "the Bloodbath"
 Bloodbath of B-R5RB, an historic Eve Online battle involving 7500+ players

See also 
 
 List of events named massacres

fi:Verilöyly
sv:Blodbad